Saleh Mohammed Nu'eimah is a Saudi Arabian soccer player.

Career 
Saleh Nu'eimah began his career on the morning of Sunday, 4 October 1976. He remained a reserve for a year and played his first game in 1977.

He scored his first goal in the return of its founder athletes Abdul Rahman bin Said. He was selected for the national team in 1979 in a record time for such selection.

He was a key player in the 1984 AFC Asian Cup held in Singapore and was named in the all-star team after the 1988 AFC Asian Cup.

References

1960 births
Saudi Arabian footballers
1984 AFC Asian Cup players
1988 AFC Asian Cup players
AFC Asian Cup-winning players
Al Hilal SFC players
Saudi Professional League players
Living people
Asian Games medalists in football
Footballers at the 1978 Asian Games
Footballers at the 1982 Asian Games
Footballers at the 1986 Asian Games
Sportspeople from Riyadh
Asian Games silver medalists for Saudi Arabia
Asian Games bronze medalists for Saudi Arabia
Association football defenders
Medalists at the 1982 Asian Games
Medalists at the 1986 Asian Games
Saudi Arabia international footballers
20th-century Saudi Arabian people